The Coyote Hills are a low mountain range in Alameda County, California.

Coyote Hills Regional Park is located in and named for these hills.

References 

Mountain ranges of the San Francisco Bay Area
Mountain ranges of Alameda County, California
Mountain ranges of Northern California